"Spring Love" (also known as "Spring Love (Come Back to Me)") is the third single from freestyle singer Stevie B's debut album Party Your Body, released in 1988.  The song achieved a higher chart placement compared to Stevie B's previous single, almost reaching the Top 40 of the Billboard Hot 100 (peaking at No. 43) and paving the way for his top 40 breakthrough the following year with the similar-sounding "I Wanna Be the One."  "Spring Love" also became Stevie B's first top ten hit on the Dance charts, peaking at number 5, and it remains one of his most popular songs.

In 2007, Stevie B re-recorded the song with rapper Pitbull, which was included on the album The Terminator.

Track listings
7" single - Spain

7" single - United States

CD maxi-single - Germany

Charts

Covers
 In 1995, the singer Abdullah released his version on the album Depende de Nós.
 In 1998, the singer Captain G.Q. released his version on the album Planet Freestyle ∙ Volume 3.
 In 2003, the singer Huey Dunbar launched its version (in Spanish and English) on the album Music for My Peoples.
 In 2008, the singer Latino released its version, which contains the participation of Stevie B in the album Junto e Misturado.
In 2014, the singer Nobel Pryze released his version produced by Mastakriz LaGuira (Alternative Merengue).

Impact on popular culture
In 2003, Brazilian funk singer, MC Fornalha released the single, "Paga Spring Love," inspired by the song by Stevie B.

References

1988 singles
Stevie B songs
1988 songs